Theatre of Magic is a pinball machine designed by John Popadiuk, produced by Midway (under the Bally brand name).

Description
The game presents four primary objectives, each of which must be completed in order to qualify for the "Grand Finale" wizard mode.

 Theatre: Spell THEATRE by shooting the left loop (one letter per shot). Doing so begins a hurry-up countdown, during which a shot into the trunk scores a bonus.
 Multiball: Shoot the ramps to spell MAGIC (one letter per shot), then lock two balls by shooting the inner loop and hit the Magic Trunk to begin Theatre Multiball.
 Midnight Madness: Repeated shots to the right loop advance the clock one hour at a time, starting from noon. Once it reaches midnight, the Midnight Madness round begins, with the clock running backwards and shots to the Magic Trunk awarding points based on the hour it shows. The clock can also be advanced with a skill shot or as a reward for sending the ball into the basement when the Trapdoor is open.
 Illusions: Hit the Magic Trunk three times to rotate it, then shoot a ball into its hole to start one of the following eight modes.
 Tiger Saw — Hit the captive ball for various animations of a tiger cutting apart items with a circular saw.
 Levitating Woman — Shoot the center ramp for increasing millions.
 Trunk Escape — Shoot the Magic Trunk four times to break the chains of a locked trunk.
 Spirit Cards — Shoot the inner loops/spinner to award increasing points per spin.
 Safe Escape — Shoot the inner loops three times to unlock the safe.
 Metamorphosis — Shoot the right ramp to transform the assistant to various animals and score increasing millions.
 Strait Jacket — Hit the jet bumpers repeatedly to undo a buckle and escape a straitjacket as spiked walls close in.
 Hat Magic — Shoot the Magic Trunk to see different items being produced from a hat.

The Grand Finale requires the player to make 12 ramp, loop, or trunk shots within 60 seconds in order to spell MAGIC THEATRE; each shot awards 50 million, with a bonus of 500 million for completing the mode.

The game uses the DCS Sound System.

Digital versions
Theatre of Magic is available as a licensed table of Pinball FX 3. It was formerly available as a licensed table of The Pinball Arcade until June 30, 2018 due to WMS license expiration. Unlicensed reproductions of this table are available for Visual Pinball for Windows.

References

External links

Pinball Archive rule sheet

1995 pinball machines
Bally pinball machines